The 1973–74 North Carolina State Wolfpack men's basketball team represented North Carolina State University during the 1973-74 NCAA Division I men's basketball season. The Wolfpack played their home games at Reynolds Coliseum in Raleigh, North Carolina, and competed as a member of the Atlantic Coast Conference. While losing only one game throughout the season, the team finished undefeated in the ACC conference play, and went on to win the 1974 ACC men's basketball title. The Wolfpack then won the NCAA tournament, finishing the season as the national champions.

Season summary

N.C. State had several highly rated players, including star high-jumping forward David Thompson, 7-foot-4 center Tom Burleson, point guard Monte Towe, and several complementary players, including guard Moe Rivers and forward Phil Spence. The Wolfpack began the season ranked #2 in the nation, behind UCLA. On December 15, 1973, the two teams met in St. Louis, with UCLA beating NC State by 84–66 after trailing by one at halftime. It would be the only loss for the Wolfpack that season. NC State later met and defeated the Bruins 80–77 in two overtimes in the NCAA tournament semi-final game, ending UCLA's streak of seven straight national championships. Two nights later, NC State won its first NCAA championship by beating Marquette 76–64.

Roster

Schedule

|-
!colspan=12 style="background:#;"| Regular Season

|-
!colspan=12 style="background:#;"| ACC tournament

|-
!colspan=12 style="background:#;"| NCAA tournament

Rankings

ACC tournament
The 1974 Atlantic Coast Conference men's basketball tournament was held in Greensboro, North Carolina, at the Greensboro Coliseum from March 7 to 9. North Carolina State defeated Maryland 103–100 in overtime to claim the championship.

The Final featured two of the top teams in the country. It has been regarded by many to be the greatest ACC game in history — and one of the greatest college games ever.  The game was instrumental in forcing the expansion of the NCAA Men's Division I Basketball Championship to 32 teams, allowing more than one bid from a conference.

NCAA tournament

 East
 North Carolina State 92, Providence 78
 North Carolina State 100, Pittsburgh 72
 Final Four
 North Carolina State 80, UCLA 77
 North Carolina State 76, Marquette 64

Awards and honors
 Tommy Burleson, ACC tournament MVP.
 David Thompson, NCAA Men's MOP Award

Team players drafted into the NBA

References

Nc State
NC State Wolfpack men's basketball seasons
NCAA Division I men's basketball tournament championship seasons
NCAA Division I men's basketball tournament Final Four seasons
Nc State
NC State Wolfpack men's basketball
NC State Wolfpack men's basketball